You is the second studio album from Phillip LaRue. Razor & Tie Records released the album on November 13, 2015. He worked with Gabe Scott, in the production of this album.

Background
LaRue worked with producer Gabe Scott to create this album, where "it was all about writing songs that were personal...about all of the different people in his life."

Critical reception
Matt Conner, indicating in a four star review by CCM Magazine, describes, "the time invested to record his first solo album in six years, You, was well worth it, with a solid pop set that sets the mood and draws you in with shades of Matthew Perryman Jones, David Gray and Emerson Hart." Signaling in a mixed review for Triton News, Ana Magallanes recognizes, "With instrumentals that lack in depth or melodic variation, the lyrics of his songs are what stand out… Or at least should stand out. You is a delightful and angelic reflection on love, but just a bit too clean and idealistic."

Track listing

References

2015 albums
Razor & Tie albums